Pain Tamushal (also Romanized as Pā’īn Tamūshal; also known as Pāeenmaḩalleh-ye Tamūshal) is a village in Ahandan Rural District, in the Central District of Lahijan County, Gilan Province, Iran. At the 2006 census, its population was 245, in 65 families.

References 

Populated places in Lahijan County